The 1984–85 Washington Huskies men's basketball team represented the University of Washington for the 1984–85 NCAA Division I men's basketball season. Led by fourteenth-year head coach Marv Harshman, the Huskies were members of the Pacific-10 Conference and played their home games on campus at Hec Edmundson Pavilion in Seattle, Washington.

There was no conference tournament this season; it debuted two years later.

Washington was seeded fifth in the West regional of the 64-team NCAA tournament, but was upset by Kentucky in the first round in Salt Lake City. The Wildcats defeated fourth-seed UNLV and advanced to the Sweet Sixteen, where they fell to  the top seed in the West.

Harshman, age 67, retired at the end of the season. Andy Russo, the head coach at Louisiana Tech, was hired in

Postseason results

|-
!colspan=6 style=| NCAA Tournament

NBA Draft

References

External links
Sports Reference – Washington Huskies: 1984–85 basketball season

Washington Huskies men's basketball seasons
Washington Huskies
Washington Huskies
Washington
Washington